Harald Frode Unneland (born 14 April 1967 in Bergen) is a Norwegian musician, drummer and multi-instrumentalist (guitar, bass guitar, keyboards, piano and vocals).

Career 
Unneland has been a central figure on the Bergen music scene. He has played in bands Savoy, Chocolate Overdose, Unge Frusterte menn, Popium, and Evig Din For Alltid.

In 2007 BBC Radio 2 chose Popium's timeless pop masterpiece Anchor Down as record of the week. In 2012 he found back to old friends, and now as 'Sergeant Petter & The Buddies' they play old songs again.

Discography

Pompel & The Pilts 
1988: Kjellerteipen
1989: Leif I Hulen – Live
1989: Det Perfekte Menneske, various artists ("Klikk Klakk")
1992: Det Ingen Andre Vil Ha (Rec 90)
1997: Nesten Alt (Rec 90)

Unge Frustrerte Menn 
1991: Slinger Og Snegler mini-CD
1995: Doddo Og Unge Frustrerte Menn (Tylden & Co)
1996: Sosialantropologi (Lucky Music)
1997: Hodet I Sanden (Grappa Music)
1998: Øl Og Peanøtter (Grappa Music)
2001: Dronningen Av Kalde Føtter (Grappa Music)
2002: Solen Titter Frem – De Beste Sangene compilation (Grappa Music)
2006: Dans Til Musikken – Tribute To Lasse Myrvold (Reel Noise Records), various artists ("Dødelige Drifter")

Chocolate Overdose 
1992: Everybody Likes Chocolate (Warner Elektra Atlantic)
1993: Sugar Baby (Warner Elektra Atlantic)
1997: Whatever (Bar None)
1999: Dingledoodies (Rune Grammofon)

Savoy 
1996: Mary Is Coming (Warner Bros. Records)
1997: Lackluster Me (EMI Records)
1999: Mountains of Time (EMI Records)
2001: Reasons To Stay Indoors (EMI Records)
2004: Savoy (Eleventeen Records)
2007: Savoy Songbook Vol. 1 (Universal Music)

Evig Din For Alltid 
2013: Evig Din For Alltid (Apollon Records)
2014: Åtte Minutter Fra Solen (Apollon Records)
2015: Tilbake Til Byen (Apollon Records)
2016: På Tynn Is (Apollon Records)

Other projects 
With a-ha
2000: Minor Earth Major Sky (Warner Elektra Atlantic)
2005: Analogue (Warner Elektra Atlantic)

With Ephemera
2000: Sun (Ephemera Records)

With Sondre Lerche
2001: No One's Gonna Come EP (Virgin Records)
2001: Sleep on Needles RP (Virgin Records), 
2001: Faces Down (Virgin Records)

With Popium
2001: Popium (Music Network Records)
2002: Permanently High (Music Network Records)
2002: Beautiful Thing EP (Music Network Records)
2004: Camp (Kong Tiki Records)
2006: The Miniature Mile (Kong Tiki Records)
2007: Anchor Down single from The Miniature Mile

With others
1999: Something Is Like Nothing Was (Smalltown Supersound), with Monopot (Powerlunch)
2002: You Know Me (Columbia Records), with Paris
2012: Sergeant Petter & The Buddies (Vme, It's A Label), with Sergeant Petter & The Buddies
2017: Easy Versions, with Daelen (Marte Dæhlen)

References

External links 

Chocolate Overdose Biography on MIC.no
Unge Frustrerte Menn Biography on MIC.no
Savoy Biography on Ballade.no
Paul Waaktaar, Lauren Savoy and Frode Unneland Savoy interview ny on YouTube
UK radio play for Popium on Listen to Norway

20th-century Norwegian drummers
21st-century Norwegian drummers
Norwegian rock drummers
Male drummers
Norwegian multi-instrumentalists
Norwegian composers
Norwegian male composers
Musicians from Bergen
1967 births
Living people
20th-century drummers
20th-century Norwegian male musicians
21st-century Norwegian male musicians